Schreuder is a Dutch occupational surname. Schreuder, from early Middle Dutch scrodere, is an archaic term for either a taylor  or a porter (dock-worker, barrow-man). People with this surname include:

Alfred Schreuder (born 1972), Dutch footballer
Dick Schreuder (born 1971), Dutch footballer
Frances Schreuder (1938–2004), American murderer
Hans Paludan Smith Schreuder (1817–1882), Norwegian missionary
Hein Schreuder (born 1951), Dutch economist and strategist
Hinkelien Schreuder (born 1984), Dutch swimmer
Jan Schreuder (1704–1764), Dutch governor of Ceylon
Louis Schreuder (born 1990), South African rugby player
Morné Schreuder (born 1979), Namibian rugby player
Pieter Meindert Schreuder (1912–1945), Dutch World War II resistance leader

Dutch-language surnames